The Dartmouth Glacier is a -long glacier in the U.S. state of Alaska. The name was reported in 1908 by Grant and Higgins (1910, pl. 2), USGS. It is presumably named for Dartmouth College in Hanover, New Hampshire.

See also
 List of glaciers

References

Glaciers of Alaska
Glaciers of Chugach Census Area, Alaska
Glaciers of Unorganized Borough, Alaska